is a Japanese manga series written and illustrated by Motohiro Katou. The series follow Sou Touma, a university graduate who encounters a variety of investigative cases after returning to Japan from the US. He works with his friend, Kana Mizuhara, combining his deductive skills with Mizuhara's social gifts.

A ten-episode television drama adaptation was broadcast on NHK from January to March 2009. A manga sequel, Q.E.D. iff, started in Shōnen Magazine R in January 2015 and was transferred to Getsu Maga Kichi online manga platform in February 2023.

In 2009, Q.E.D. won the 33rd Kodansha Manga Award in the shōnen category.

Plot
Kana Mizuhara, a high school girl, becomes the first person to discover a locked room murder case in which her friend's father is the victim, along with her friend. After that, on the first floor of the building where the shooting took place, Kana happens to meet Sou Touma, who recently transferred to another school. Although she graduated from MIT's mathematics department at the top of her class at the age of 15, for some reason she came to a normal high school in Japan. Kana, learned of his intelligence and high technology and knowledge of electronic devices, and involved him in order to help her.

Characters

Main characters

Sou is a genius detective, not particularly interested in going out and finding wrongs to right. Rather, it is his erstwhile partner Kana who drags him into getting involved. An introvert, he is well-known for his intelligence, although he is not particularly popular. Sou is introduced when Kana Mizuhara rescues him from an irate customer at a video arcade. He then assists Kana's father in finding a murderer. After that, he and Kana are often seen together, although she denies they are going out. Sou's past is a mystery, and he appears to be a sort of polymath with a wide range of knowledge. What is known is that he graduated from MIT in the United States and was planning on continuing to graduate school, but then decided to drop out for unknown reasons and came to join Kana's high school. While highly intelligent, Sou is often seen being amused by such simple things as snowflakes, suggesting he did not have an ordinary childhood. During cases, he becomes even more quiet and it is sometimes hinted that, in addition to Kana's prompting, he only solves cases for his own reasons.
Sou is also often the unfortunate recipient of Kana's violent tendencies, as he is often bopped on the head for reasons ranging from asking an embarrassing question in public to accidentally looking up her shorts. Despite this, and despite complaining whenever Kana drags him somewhere against his will, he demonstrates concern for her, often taking her along whenever he goes out of town. He also doesn't mind it when people call Kana his girlfriend.
Besides being a genius, Sou is also wealthy and can speak in a number of languages including French. He is seen as having interest in archaeology and biology. He has a younger sister named Yuu who is a genius with all languages; however she is so spacy that she often forgets what she's supposed to be doing.

Kana is a spirited, tomboy who excels in virtually every sport she attempts. Brave, athletic and rather pretty, she has also been described as having a heart "big enough to float a planet". It is her willingness to help others than draws Sou into cases. She first encounters Sou when she rescues him from being attacked by a bully at a video arcade. She is warned by her close friend that Sou is mysterious (having apparently come to their high school after leaving MIT) and she should probably leave him alone. Shortly thereafter, her friend learns her father was murdered, leading Kana to drag Sou along for support. Her father, Detective Mizuhara, is in charge of the case and with Sou's help arrests the murderer. Since then, the two have been nearly inseparable, in that Kana drags Sou almost wherever she goes. She categorically denies that the two are dating, but there have been many hints in the manga that she is slowly developing feelings for him (on one occasion, when she learns both of them have no plans for Christmas she attempts to ask him if he'd like to spend it with her). She later admits to a female senpai (upperclassman) who was interested in Sou that she is confused about the relationship between herself and Sou because she think they are more than friends yet she still can't name the feeling she feels nor can she describe their relationship. The fact that she knows so little about his past bothers her greatly, and she often tries to find out more about him, going so far as to secretly follow him after school. What little she learns often either impresses her or makes her unhappy at how much Sou's been through. Kana is a popular student, and she is often seen in a leadership role. She practices judo and kendo, the former skill often coming in handy when attempting to defend herself or Sou and apprehending suspects. She is also infamous for her violent tendencies, showing no mercy to anyone who suggests there is something more to her and Sou than friendship.

Supporting characters

Kana's father. A gruff, unshaven police detective, he is introduced as the chief investigator of the murder of Kana's friend's father. Upon returning home and noticing Sou's shoes, he is initially outraged that a boy was not only visiting, but was in his daughter's room unsupervised. Despite the circumstances of their meeting, Sou manages to impress the detective with his wide range of knowledge. After Sou unmasked the murderer, the detective develops a healthy respect for his abilities. He comes to trust Sou a great deal as he often allows Kana to accompany him on trips and occasionally includes him in family events (such as attending baseball games). He reaches a point where he is no longer surprised to see Sou and Kana together most of the time.

Real name . An old friend of Sou from MIT, Loki is, like Sou, a highly intelligent (although sometimes crude) individual. He and Sou are like brothers, and he often teases the younger boy. In his first appearance, he and Eva visit Kana and Sou's high school to look for the latter, getting into a confrontation with school staff which is eventually defused by Sou's arrival. He, Sou and Kana since then meet on many cases where his generally more emotional personality acts as a counterpoint to Sou's colder, more logical one. Loki was one of the people Kana contacted for help when Sou went missing in the US during the Annie Craner murders. Nicknamed after Loki, the god of mischief from Norse mythology, he enjoys riddles, pranks and games like his namesake. While he and Kana get along fine, she objects to his smoking habit.

Loki's partner and love interest. A dark-skinned Asian girl, she, Loki and Sou were friends at MIT. However when Sou and Loki were in competition Eva stole and destroyed Sou's thesis. Years later, Sou revealed he knew about it, but said nothing because he knew she did it out of love for Loki. While Loki is initially outraged, Sou calms him and says he'd long since forgiven her. Eva makes occasionally appearances in the manga in a supporting role, often assisting Loki.
Yuu Touma
Sou's younger sister, Yuu is highly intelligent in her own right. A polyglot, she first appears attempting to visit her brother, but somehow gets lost.  Since then, she makes occasional visits and rather than help her brilliant brother out in solving cases, she provides him insight and backstory. She and Kana get along well, and Yuu shares some of Sou's history with her, including the story of Annie Craner. When Sou goes missing in the US during the Annie Craner-related murders, Yuu accompanies Kana in search of him. She later acts as a messenger for their parents, passing an invitation to Kana to meet them.
Sou and Yuu's parents
They are often only shown from the neck down, the only time their faces are shown is in a flashback of a case in the past when Sou was accused of stealing a bike. In their brief appearance they proved to be rather flighty, going so far as to suddenly organise a trip to another country simply to settle an argument on where the world's largest Buddha statue was. This was despite the fact they had sent Kana an invitation to meet them. They pass on a letter to Yuu, where they apologize for not meeting Kana and ask her to continue to look after Sou.

An important part of Sou's life when he was in the US, she is young prosecutor he befriended. She was shot after winning a difficult, emotionally charged case and presumed dead. Sou is a witness, and the event still haunts him when a killer begins stalking and eliminating people involved in the case. The manga hints that Sou had a crush on her, and her shooting affected him badly. Sou encouraged her to see the case through to the end, and so her fate fills him with guilt. It is revealed that Craner faked her death and she is deeply cared for Sou's safety. Craner even go as far as kissing Sou in the cheek then teasing him with the fact that Kana is looking for him and telling him 'to erase the kiss mark'.

Media

Manga
Written and illustrated by Motohiro Katou, Q.E.D. started in Kodansha's shōnen manga magazine Magazine Great'''s July 1997 issue. Magazine Great was rebranded as Magazine E-no on April 20, 2009, and the series ran in the magazine until it ceased publication on June 22, 2011. The series was transferred to the then brand new magazine  on October 20, 2011, until the magazine ceased publication on February 20, 2014. Kodansha collected its chapters in fifty tankōbon volumes, released from December 16, 1998, to February 17, 2015.

A sequel, titled , started in Shōnen Magazine R on April 20, 2015. Shōnen Magazine R ceased publication on January 20, 2023, and the series was transferred to the online manga platform Getsu Maga Kichi on February 14 of the same year. Kodansha released the first tankōbon volume on June 17, 2015. As of November 16, 2022, twenty-three volumes have been released.

Drama
A ten-episode television drama was broadcast on NHK from January 8 to March 12, 2009. The series stars Aoi Nakamura as Sou Ai Takahashi and as Kana.

ReceptionQ.E.D. won the 33rd Kodansha Manga Award in the shōnen'' category in 2009.

References

Further reading

External links
  
 Official drama website 
 
 

Detective anime and manga
Kodansha manga
NHK original programming
Shōnen manga
Winner of Kodansha Manga Award (Shōnen)